The men's skeet shooting competition at the 2004 Summer Olympics was held on August 21 and 22 at the Markópoulo Olympic Shooting Centre near Athens, Greece. 

The event consisted of two rounds: a qualifier and a final. In the qualifier, each shooter fired 5 sets of 25 shots in the set order of skeet shooting.

In this last Olympic skeet competition before rules were changed, Marko Kemppainen attained a perfect 125 to break the world and Olympic records in the qualification round, but missed one target in the final, allowing Andrea Benelli to catch him up with a score of 149 to force the gold medal shoot-off. Meanwhile, Cuba's Juan Miguel Rodríguez had shared a score of 147 targets with Qatar's Nasser Al-Attiyah and United States' Shawn Dulohery, until he fired a perfect ten in a three-way shoot-off to grab the bronze.

Records
Prior to this competition, the existing world and Olympic records were as follows.

Qualification round

=OR Equalled Olympic record – =WR Equalled World record – Q Qualified for final – SO 1 Shoot-off for third place – SO 2 Shoot-off for sixth place

Final

References

External links
Official Results

Men's Skeet
Men's events at the 2004 Summer Olympics